This is a list of records in the 24 Hours of Le Mans since 1923. This page is accurate up to and including the 2021 24 Hours of Le Mans.

Constructor records

Most total wins

Most consecutive wins

Most win(s) by nations

Most wins by cars

Most wins by team

Most consecutive wins by specific cars

Other constructor records

Driver records

Most total wins

Most consecutive wins

Most winning drivers per nation

Most total driver wins per nation

Drivers who have won in their first entries

Drivers who have won in all of their entries

Most total starts

Other driver records

Race records

Grid start records
Note: The first qualification occurred in 1963.

Most pole positions by constructor

Most wins per starting position

Other records

Most wins by tyre supplier

Most wins by fuel type

Notes

Auto racing lists
Records
Auto racing records